Motheo Mohapi (born 8 August 1968) is a Mosotho former footballer who played as a midfielder. He played for the Lesotho national football team between 1995 and 2000.

From 2006 until March 2007, he coached the Lesotho national football team.

References

External links
 

Association football midfielders
Lesotho footballers
Lesotho international footballers
Lesotho football managers
Lesotho national football team managers
1968 births
Living people